Taurorcus mourei is a species of beetle in the family Cerambycidae. It was described by Marinoni in 1969.

References

Acanthoderini
Beetles described in 1969